Ooze may refer to:

 Pelagic sediments, fine-grained sediments on the ocean floor, containing at least 30% biogenous material

Games
 Ooze (Dungeons & Dragons), a type of monster in the Dungeons & Dragons role-playing game
 The Ooze, a 1995 video game by Sega Technical Institute
 A video game in the Action 52 series
 A type of monster in Bungie's Pathways Into Darkness video game
 A substance in Nicktoons: Battle for Volcano Island

Other
 Ooze, by Anthony M. Rud (1923)
 Ooze, Sly Sludge's sidekick in Captain Planet and the Planeteers
 The Ooze, a substance in Teenage Mutant Ninja Turtles
 Ivan Ooze, the villain in Mighty Morphin Power Rangers: The Movie

See also
 Slime (disambiguation)
 Ooz (disambiguation)